Datuk Halimah binti Mohamed Sadique (Jawi: حليمة بنت محمد صادق; born 2 February 1962) is a Malaysian politician who served as the Minister of National Unity for the second term in the Barisan Nasional (BN) administration under former Prime Minister Ismail Sabri Yaakob from August 2021 to the collapse of the BN administration in November 2022 and her first term in the Perikatan Nasional (PN) administration under former Prime Minister Muhyiddin Yassin from March 2020 to August 2021 as well as the Member of Parliament (MP) for Kota Tinggi from May 2018 to November 2022. She also served as Deputy Minister of Urban Wellbeing, Housing and Local Government in the BN administration under former Prime Minister Najib Razak and former Minister Abdul Rahman Dahlan from May 2013 to July 2015. She is a member of the United Malays National Organisation (UMNO), a component party of the BN administration.

Political career
She served as the Deputy Minister of Urban Wellbeing, Housing, and Local Government in the Barisan Nasional (BN) administration under former Prime Minister Najib Razak and former Ministers Abdul Rahman Dahlan as well as Noh Omar from May 2013 to the collapse of the BN administration in May 2018, MP for Tenggara from March 2008 to May 2018, Member of the Johor State Legislative Assembly (MLA) for Pasir Raja from March 2004 to March 2008 and MLA for Gunung Lambak from April 1995 to March 2004. She is also a member of the United Malay National Organisation (UMNO), a component party of the BN coalition which is aligned with the PN coalition.

Halimah was elected to federal Parliament in the 2008 general elections, having previously served in the State Assembly of Johor and on the Johor State Executive Council. She was re-elected in the 2013 election and appointed as Deputy Minister of Urban Wellbeing, Housing, and Local Government in the Cabinet of Prime Minister Najib Razak.

Halimah contested and won the Kota Tinggi parliamentary in the 2018 general elections instead, but BN had lost power in recapturing the federal government to the Pakatan Harapan (PH) coalition, only to regain power in 2020.

Health
In January 2021, Halimah was tested positive for COVID-19.

Election results

Honours

Honours of Malaysia
  :
  Commander of the Order of Meritorious Service (PJN) - Datuk (2003)
  :
  Knight Commander of the Order of Malacca (DCSM) - Datuk Wira (2017)

External links

References

Living people
1962 births
People from Johor
Malaysian people of Malay descent
Malaysian Muslims
Members of the Dewan Rakyat
United Malays National Organisation politicians
Government ministers of Malaysia
Women government ministers of Malaysia
Women members of the Dewan Rakyat
Members of the Johor State Legislative Assembly
Women MLAs in Johor
Johor state executive councillors
Commanders of the Order of Meritorious Service
21st-century Malaysian women politicians
21st-century Malaysian politicians